FIFA 06: Road to FIFA World Cup is a video game developed by EA Sports and DICE for the Xbox 360. The game is an officially licensed product of the 2006 FIFA World Cup finals held in Germany. FIFA 06: Road to FIFA World Cup World Cup mode only includes UEFA qualification groups for the 2006 World Cup.
 
Released in 2005, this was the first FIFA game for a 7th-generation console. Road to FIFA World Cup is an Xbox 360 exclusive and preceded the release of 2006 FIFA World Cup game on the PS2, Xbox, Xbox 360 and other consoles by several months. It offers superior graphics to previous versions, though at the expense of many gameplay features. For the first time in the FIFA series, it allows the player to practise shooting against the goalkeeper while each match is loading.

Reception

The game was met with mixed reception upon release, as GameRankings gave it a score of 62.55%, while Metacritic gave it 62 out of 100.

See also
FIFA 06
 2006 FIFA World Cup (video game)

References

External links

2005 video games
EA Sports games
Electronic Arts games
2006
2006 Road to FIFA World Cup
Video games developed in Canada
Video games set in 2004
Video games set in 2005
Xbox 360 games
Xbox 360-only games